Ataúlfo is one form of the Spanish name equivalent to Adolf (the other being Adolfo). It may refer to:
Ataulf, 5th-century king of the Visigoths
Ataúlfo Argenta (1913-1958), a Spanish conductor
Ataulfo (mango), a mango cultivar